Red Bridge Hydro (shortened to "Red Bridge") is a hydroelectric power plant located on the Chicopee River in the towns of Wilbraham, Ludlow, Palmer, and Belchertown, Massachusetts. It was constructed in 1901 and is currently owned by Central Rivers Power LLC and operated by Ware River Power Inc.

Dam, Powerhouse, Canal and Headgate

Dam 
At the north end of the dam, is a 165 foot-long earth embankment with a concrete core. The middle section contains a 300 foot-long overflow spillway. The southern end is also a 362 foot-long earthen embankment with a concrete core. The highest point of the dam is approximately 51 feet tall and creates a bypass reach of almost half of a mile (2,160 feet).

Power Canal and Headgate 
The canal headgate is a wooden building with a granite block foundation. It houses 10 intake gates. The intake gates allow water from the reservoir to flow into the power canal. These gates are manually operated and have dimensions of 5.5 feet tall and 8.5 feet wide. The power canal is 340 feet long by 73 feet wide and 13 feet deep. It extends from the headgate to the intake structure (contains trashrack and penstock). The walls are made of cut Granite.  Looking down from the headgate, to the right of the intake structure, is the ice sluice (a small dam on the side of the canal for ice to fall off of) which is made from stone blocks). The sluice crosses under Red Bridge Rd and back into the Chicopee River.

Powerhouse 
The powerhouse is a brick building with a stone foundation. It has the turbine wells to run 4 units (generators/turbines). In the northern end of the building are units No. 1 and No. 2. They were horizontal water wheels with 40 cycle generators. They were retired in 1938 and were removed sometime after. Between 2009 and 2019, the penstocks for the units were removed. In the southern end of the building are units No. 3 and No.4, which are still operating. There are 4 discharge bays, one for each unit. Two still discharge water from the operating units into thel, which runs 735 feet back to the Chicopee River.

Chicopee River Reservoir 
The Chicopee River Reservoir (Red Bridge Pool) is a 180 acre impoundment (reservoir), formed by the Red Bridge Dam. It is neighbored by a 106 acre impoundment, located north of the main impoundment, which is fed by the Broad Brook. The main impoundment is fed by the Chicopee River and has a boat ramp (Red Bridge Boat Ramp). The boat ramp sits on the south side of the headgate.

References 

1901 establishments in Massachusetts
Buildings and structures in Hampden County, Massachusetts
Energy infrastructure completed in 1901
Hydroelectric power plants in Massachusetts